Papyrus 18 (in the Gregory–Aland numbering), designated by 𝔓18, is an early copy of the New Testament in Greek. It is a papyrus manuscript containing the beginning of the Book of Revelation. It contains only Revelation 1:4–7. It is written against the fibres of the papyrus. On the other side of the papyrus is the ending of the book of Exodus. It is unclear whether the papyrus was a scroll of Exodus later reused for a copy of Revelation or a leaf from a codex with miscellaneous contents.  The two sides of the papyrus were copied in different hands, but the original editor of the papyrus did not think there was a great interval of time between the copying of the two sides. He assigned the Exodus to the third century and the Revelation to the third or early fourth century.

Description 

The Greek text of this manuscript is a representative of the Alexandrian text-type. Aland placed it in Category I.

 Revelation 1:5
 λυσαντι ημας εκ — P18, אc, A, C, 2020, 2081, 2814
 λουσαντι ημας απο — P, 046, 94, 1006, 1859, 2042, 2065, 2073, 2138, 2432

It is currently housed at the British Library (Inv. 2053v) in London.

Text 
[Ιωαννης τα]ι[ς επτα] εκ[λησ]ιαις
[ταις εν τη] Ασια χαρις υμειν και ειρη
[νη απο ο ων] και ο ην και ο ερχομε
[νος και απο τ[ων επτα πνευμα
[των α] εν[ω]πιον του θρονου αυ
[τ]ου και απο   ο μαρτυς ο πι
στος ο πρωτοτοκος των νεκρω
και ο αρχων των βασιλεων της γης
τω αγαπωντι ημας και λυσαντι η
[μ]ας εκ των αμαρτιων ημων εν
[τ]ω αιματι αυτου και εποιησεν ημ[ας]
[βα]σ[ιλ]ειαν ιερεις του a και π[α]τρι
[αυτο]υ. αυτω το κρατος και η δοξα
[εις το]υς αιωνας αμην ιδου
[ερχε]ται μετα των νεφελων
[και οψε]ται αυτον πας οφθαλ
[μος και ο]ιτινες αυτον εξε[κεντησαν]

a The scribe corrected this to τω

See also
 List of New Testament papyri
 Revelation 1

References

Further reading 
 
 Brent Nongbri. "Losing a Curious Christian Scroll but Gaining a Curious Christian Codex: An Oxyrhynchus Papyrus of Exodus and Revelation," Novum Testamentum 55 (2013), pp. 77–88.
 Philip W. Comfort and David P. Barrett, The Text of the Earliest New Testament Greek Manuscripts. Wheaton, Illinois: Tyndale House Publishers Incorporated, 2001, pp. 103–105.

External links 
 Papyrus 2053 at the British Library, verso (and recto)
 P. Oxy. VIII, 1079 from Papyrology at Oxford's "POxy: Oxyrhynchus Online"

New Testament papyri
Septuagint manuscripts
4th-century biblical manuscripts
British Library collections
Book of Revelation papyri